IEEE Transactions on Magnetics is a monthly peer-reviewed scientific journal that covers the basic physics of magnetism, magnetic materials, applied magnetics, magnetic devices, and magnetic data storage. The editor-in-chief is Pavel Kabos (National Institute of Standards and Technology).

Abstracting and indexing 
The journal is abstracted and indexed in the Science Citation Index, Current Contents/Physical, Chemical & Earth Sciences, Scopus, CSA databases, and EBSCOhost. According to the Journal Citation Reports, the journal has a recent impact factor of 1.7.

References

External links 
 

Physics journals
Materials science journals
Transactions on Magnetics
Monthly journals
English-language journals
Publications established in 1965